Uleb Ragnvaldsson was a military leader of Novgorod Republic in conquering of Yugra in 1032.

His father was the jarl of Staraya Ladoga (Aldeigjuborg) Ragnvald Ulfsson and his mother Ingeborg Tryggvasdotter was the daughter of Tryggve Olafsson, the granddaughter of Harald Fairhair, and the sister of Olaf I of Norway. According some historians, he was a grandfather of Gyuryata Rogovich, from the famous Novgorod boyar family (:ru:Гюрятиничи-Роговичи).

References

Posadniks of Novgorod